A variety of musical terms are likely to be encountered in printed scores, music reviews, and program notes. Most of the terms are Italian, in accordance with the Italian origins of many European musical conventions. Sometimes, the special musical meanings of these phrases differ from the original or current Italian meanings. Most of the other terms are taken from French and German, indicated by Fr. and Ger., respectively.

Unless specified, the terms are Italian or English. The list can never be complete: some terms are common, and others are used only occasionally, and new ones are coined from time to time. Some composers prefer terms from their own language rather than the standard terms listed here.

0–9

 1′  "sifflet" or one foot organ stop
 I  usually for orchestral string instruments, used to indicate that the player should play the passage on the highest-pitched, thinnest string
 ′  Tierce organ stop
 2′  two feet – pipe organ indication; see 
 ′  pipe organ stop for the twelfth interval
 II  usually for orchestral string instruments, used to indicate that the player should play the passage on the string adjacent to the highest-pitched, thinnest string, ie the  highest string
 II  cymbal stop on pipe organ
 III  usually for orchestral string instruments, used to indicate that the player should play the passage on string adjacent to (but higher in pitch) than the lowest-pitched, thickest string, ie the third-highest string
 4′ four feet – pipe organ rank that speaks one octave higher than 8′
 IV  usually for orchestral string instruments, used to indicate that the player should play the passage on the lowest-pitched, thickest string, ie the fourth-highest string
 IV–VI  mixture stop on pipe organ
 8′  eight-foot pipe – pipe organ indication
 16′  sixteen-foot pipe – pipe organ indication calling for one octave below 8′
 32′  thirty-two-foot pipe – pipe organ indication calling for two octaves below 8′ also called sub-bass
 64′  sixty-four-foot pipe – pipe organ indication (only a few organs have this deep a pitch)

A 
 a or à (Fr.)  at, to, by, for, in
 à la (Fr.)  in the style of...
 a battuta  Return to normal tempo after a deviation. Not recommended in string parts, due to possible confusion with battuto (qv.); use a tempo, which means the same thing
 a bene placito  Up to the performer
 a cappella  lit. "as in a chapel"; vocal parts only, without instrumental accompaniment
 a capriccio  A free and capricious approach to tempo
 a due (a 2) intended as a duet; for two voices or instruments; together; two instruments are to play in unison after a solo passage for one of the instruments
 a niente To nothing; indicating a diminuendo which fades completely away
 a piacere  At pleasure (i.e. the performer need not follow the rhythm strictly, for example in a cadenza)
 a prima vista  lit. "at first sight". Sight-reading (i.e. played or sung from written notation but without prior review of the written material; refer to the figure)
 a tempo  In time (i.e. the performer should return to the main tempo of the piece, such as after an accelerando or ritardando); also may be found in combination with other terms such as a tempo giusto (in strict time) or a tempo di menuetto (at the speed of a minuet)
 abafando (Port.)  muffled, muted
 abandon or avec (Fr.)  free, unrestrained, passionate
 abbandonatamente, con abbandono  freely, in relaxed mode
 aber (Ger.)  but
 accarezzevole  Expressive and caressing
  (accel.)  Accelerating; gradually increasing the tempo
 accelerato  with increased tempo
 accent  Accent, emphasis
 accentato/accentuato  Accented; with emphasis
 acceso  Ignited, on fire
 accessible  Music that is easy to listen to/understand
 acciaccato  Broken down, crushed; the sounding of the notes of a chord not quite simultaneously, but from bottom to top
 acciaccatura  Crushing (i.e. a very fast grace note that is "crushed" against the note that follows and takes up no value in the measure)
 accidental A note that is not part of the scale indicated by the key signature.
   Accompanied (i.e. with the accompaniment following the soloist, who may speed up or slow down at will)
 accuratezza  Precision; accuracy. con accuratezza: with precision
 acoustic  Relating to music produced by instruments, as opposed to electric or electronic means
 ad libitum (commonly ad lib; Latin)  At liberty (i.e. the speed and manner of execution are left to the performer. It can also mean improvisation.)
 adagietto  Fairly slowly (but faster than adagio)
 adagio  Slowly
 adagissimo  Very, very slowly
 affannato, affannoso  Anguished
 affettuoso, affettuosamente, or affectueusement (Fr.)  With affect (that is, with emotion); see also con affetto
   Hurrying, pressing onwards
 agile  Agile, nimble
 agitato  Agitated
 al or alla  To the, in the manner of (al before masculine nouns, alla before feminine)
 alcuna licenza  Used in con alcuna licenza, meaning (play) with some freedom in the time, see rubato
 alla breve  In cut-time; two beats per measure or the equivalent thereof
 alla marcia  In the style of a march
 alla polacca  In the style of a polonaise, a  dance
 allargando  Broadening, becoming progressively slower
 allegretto  A little lively, moderately fast
 allegretto vivace  A moderately quick tempo
 allegrezza  Cheerfulness, joyfulness
 allegrissimo  Very fast, though slower than presto
 allegro  Cheerful or brisk; but commonly interpreted as lively, fast
 all'ottava  "at the octave", see ottava
 alt (Eng.), alt dom, or altered dominant  A jazz term which instructs chord-playing musicians such as a jazz pianist or jazz guitarist to perform a dominant (V7) chord with at least one (often both) altered (sharpened or flattened) 5th or 9th
 altissimo  Very high; see also in altissimo
 alto  High; often refers to a particular range of voice, higher than a tenor but lower than a soprano
 alzate sordini  Lift or raise the mutes (i.e. remove mutes)
 am Steg (Ger.)  At the bridge (i.e. playing a bowed string instrument near its bridge, which produces a heavier, stronger tone); see sul ponticello
 amabile  Amiable, pleasant
 ambitus  Range between highest and lowest note
 amore or amor (Sp./Port., sometimes It.)  Love; con amore: with love, tenderly
 amoroso  Loving
 anacrusis  A note or notes that precede the first full bar; a pickup
 andamento  Used to refer to a fugue subject of above-average length
 andante  At a walking pace (i.e. at a moderate tempo)
 andantino  Slightly faster than andante (but earlier it is sometimes used to mean slightly slower than andante)
 ängstlich (Ger.)  Anxiously
 anima  Soul; con anima: with feeling
 animandosi  Progressively more animated
 animato  Animated, lively
 antiphon  A liturgical or other composition consisting of choral responses, sometimes between two choirs; a passage of this nature forming part of another composition; a repeated passage in a psalm or other liturgical piece, similar to a refrain.
 antiphonal A style of composition in which two sections of singers or instrumentalists exchange sections or music one after the other; typically the performers are on different sides of a hall or venue
 apaisé (Fr.)  Calmed
 appassionato  Passionate
 appoggiatura or leaning note  One or more grace notes that take up some note value of the next full note.
 arco The bow used for playing some string instruments (i.e. played with the bow, as opposed to pizzicato, in music for bowed instruments); normally used to cancel a pizzicato direction
 aria  Self-contained piece for one voice usually with orchestral accompaniment (which may be provided by a pianist using an orchestral reduction)
 arietta  A short aria
 arioso  Airy, or like an air (a melody) (i.e. in the manner of an aria); melodious
 armonioso  Harmonious
 arpeggio, arpeggiato played like a harp (i.e. the notes of the chords are to be played quickly one after another instead of simultaneously); in music for piano, this is sometimes a solution in playing a wide-ranging chord whose notes cannot be played otherwise; arpeggios are frequently used as an accompaniment; see also broken chord
 articulato  Articulate
 assai  Much, Very much
 assez (Fr.)  Enough, sufficiently
attacca Attack or attach; go straight on (i.e. at the end of a movement, a direction to attach the next movement to the previous one, without a gap or pause). Often used as "attacca subito," meaning a "sudden" movement transition (literally, "attack suddenly").
 Ausdruck (Ger.)  Expression
 ausdrucksvoll or mit Ausdruck (Ger.)  Expressively, with expression
 avec (Fr.)  With

B 
   German for B flat (also in Swedish, Norwegian, Finnish, Icelandic, Danish, Croatian, Estonian and Hungarian); H in German is B natural
   (from the Italian Ballabile meaning "danceable") In ballet the term refers to a dance performed by the corps de ballet. The term Grand ballabile is used if nearly all participants (including principal characters) of a particular scene in a full-length work perform a large-scale dance.
 bar, or measure  unit of music containing a number of beats as indicated by a time signature; also the vertical bar enclosing it.
   Barbarous (notably used in Allegro barbaro by Béla Bartók)
   A term that instructs string performers to play a pizzicato note to pull the string away from the fingerboard so that it snaps back percussively on the fingerboard.
   The lowest of the standard four voice ranges (bass, tenor, alto, soprano); the lowest melodic line in a musical composition, often thought of as defining and supporting the harmony; in an orchestral context, the term usually refers to the double bass.
   Continuous bass, i.e. a bass accompaniment part played continuously throughout a piece by a chordal instrument (pipe organ, harpischord, lute, etc.), often with a bass instrument, to give harmonic structure; used especially in the Baroque period
  (Fr.)  Used in the 17th century to refer to ornaments consisting of two adjacent notes, such as trills or mordents
  (Ital.)  To strike the strings with the bow (on a bowed stringed instrument)
   Horizontal or diagonal line used to connect multiple consecutive notes.
  
 The pronounced rhythm of music
 One single stroke of a rhythmic accent
Spirited, vivacious, lively
   Warlike, aggressive (English cognate is "bellicose")
  or   Well; in ben marcato ("well marked") for example
   Jazz term referring either to establishing a pitch, sliding down half a step and returning to the original pitch or sliding up half a step from the original note.
  (Ger.)  Accelerated, as in mit beschleunigter Geschwindigkeit, at an accelerated tempo
  (Ger.)  Moved, with speed
   A musical form in two sections: AB
   A slang term for fermata, which instructs the performer to hold a note or chord as long as they wish or following cues from a conductor
  (Fr., It.)  Twice (i.e. repeat the relevant action or passage)
   Whispering (i.e. a special tremolo effect on the harp where a chord or note is rapidly repeated at a low volume)
  with closed mouth (sometimes abbreviated B.C.)
   Boldness; as in con bravura, boldly, flaunting technical skill
  (Ger.)  Broad
  
 Transitional passage connecting two sections of a composition, or between two A sections (e.g., in an A/B/A form).
 Part of a violin family or guitar/lute stringed instrument that holds the strings in place and transmits their vibrations to the resonant body of the instrument.
   Brilliantly, with sparkle. Play in a showy and spirited style.
  or   Vigour; usually in con brio: with spirit or vigour
   A chord in which the notes are not all played at once, but in some more or less consistent sequence. They may follow singly one after the other, or two notes may be immediately followed by another two, for example. See also arpeggio, which as an accompaniment pattern may be seen as a kind of broken chord; see Alberti bass.
   Brusquely, suddenly

C
 cabaletta The concluding, rapid, audience-rousing section of an aria
 cadence  A melodic or harmonic configuration that creates a sense of resolution
 cadenza  A solo section, usually in a concerto or similar work, that is used to display the performer's technique, sometimes at considerable length
 calando  Falling away, or lowering (i.e. getting slower and quieter; ritardando along with diminuendo)
 calma  Calm; so con calma, calmly. Also calmato meaning calmed, relaxed
 calore  Warmth; so con calore, warmly
 cambiare  To change (i.e. any change, such as to a new instrument)
 cambiata An ornamental tone following a principal tone by a skip up or down, usually of a third, and proceeding in the opposite direction by a step, not to be confused with changing tone. 
 canon or kanon (Ger.)  A theme that is repeated and imitated and built upon by other instruments with a time delay, creating a layered effect; see Pachelbel's Canon.
 cantabile or cantando  In a singing style. In instrumental music, a style of playing that imitates the way the human voice might express the music, with a measured tempo and flexible legato.
 cantilena  a vocal melody or instrumental passage in a smooth, lyrical style
 canto  Chorus; choral; chant
 cantus mensuratus or cantus figuratus (Lat.)
Meaning respectively "measured song" or "figured song". Originally used by medieval music theorists, it refers to polyphonic song with exactly measured notes and is used in contrast to cantus planus. A later term for cantus mensuratus or cantus figuratus is cantus musicus ("musical song").
 capo 1. capo (short for capotasto: "nut") : A key-changing device for stringed instruments (e.g. guitars and banjos)
 2. head (i.e. the beginning, as in da capo)
 capriccio  "A humorous, fanciful, or bizarre, composition, often characterized by an idiosyncratic departure from current stylistic norms." See also: Capriccio (disambiguation)
 capriccioso  Capricious, unpredictable, volatile
 cassa  Drum, usually an orchestral bass drum.  Sometimes written as Gran Cassa where Gran specifically means Bass
 cavalleresco  Chivalrous (used in Carl Nielsen's violin concerto)
 cédez (Fr.)  Yield, give way
 cesura or caesura (Lat.)  Break, stop; (i.e. a complete break in sound) (sometimes nicknamed "railroad tracks" in reference to their appearance)
 chiuso  Closed (i.e. muted by hand) (for a horn, or similar instrument; but see also bocca chiusa, which uses the feminine form)
 coda  A tail (i.e. a closing section appended to a movement)
 codetta  A small coda, but usually applied to a passage appended to a section of a movement, not to a whole movement
 col canto  with the singing, see  colla voce
 col legno  with the wood: for bowed strings, strike the strings with the stick of the bow (col legno battuto) or draw the stick across the strings (col legno tratto)
 col pugno  With the fist (e.g.,  bang the piano with the fist)
 coll'ottava  With the addition of the octave note above or below the written note; abbreviated as col 8, coll' 8, and c. 8va
   literally "with the part". An indication that another (written-out) part should be followed, i.e. accommodate the tempo, expression, phrasing, and possible rubato of the leading part. In vocal music, also expressed by colla voce
 colla voce  literally "with the voice". An instruction, in a choral or orchestral part, that a vocal part should be followed, e.g., play the same notes as the vocal part and accommodate the tempo, expression, etc. of the vocalist 
 coloratura  Coloration (i.e. elaborate ornamentation of a vocal line, or a soprano voice that is well-suited to such elaboration)
 colossale  Enormous
 come prima  As before, typically referring to an earlier tempo
 come sopra  As above (i.e. like the previous tempo)
The symbol is not a C as an abbreviation for common time, but a broken circle; the full circle at one time stood for triple time, .
 comodo  Comfortable (i.e. at moderate speed); also, allegro comodo, tempo comodo, etc.
 comp  1. abbreviation of accompanying, accompanying music, accompaniment
 2. describes the chords, rhythms, and countermelodies that instrumental players used to support a musician's melody and improvised solos.
 3. Ostinato
 comping (jazz) 1. to comp; action of accompanying.
 con  With; used in very many musical directions, for example con allegrezza (with liveliness), con amore (with tenderness); (see also col and colla)
   See dolce
  or con sordine (plural)  With a mute, or with mutes. Frequently seen in music as (incorrect Italian) con sordino, or con sordini (plural).
 concerto  Composition for solo instrument(s) and orchestra
 concerto grosso  Composition for a group of solo instruments (concertino or soli) and orchestra (ripieno or tutti)
 conjunct  An adjective applied to a melodic line that moves by step (intervals of a 2nd) rather in disjunct motion (by leap).
 contralto  Lowest female singing voice type
 contrapuntalism  See counterpoint
 coperti  (plural of coperto) covered (i.e. on a drum, muted with a cloth)
 corda  String. On the piano it refers to use of the soft pedal which controls whether the hammer strikes one or three strings; see una corda, tre corde below.
 count  Series of regularly occurring sounds to assist with ready identification of beat
 crescendo  Growing; (i.e. progressively louder) (contrast diminuendo)
 cuivré  Brassy. Used almost exclusively as a French Horn technique to indicate a forced, rough tone. A note marked both stopped and loud will be cuivré automatically
 custos  Symbol at the very end of a staff of music which indicates the pitch for the first note of the next line as a warning of what is to come. The custos was commonly used in handwritten Renaissance and typeset Baroque music.
 cut time  Same as the meter : two half-note (minim) beats per measure. Notated and executed like common time, except with the beat lengths doubled. This comes from a literal cut of the  symbol of common time. Thus, a quarter note in cut time is only half a beat long, and a measure has only two beats. See also alla breve.

D 
 da capo  From the head (i.e. from the beginning) (see also capo)
 dal segno (D.S.)  From the sign
 dal segno alla coda (D.S. alla coda)  Repeat to the sign and continue to the coda sign, then play coda
 dal segno al fine (D.S. al fine)  From the sign to the end (i.e. return to a place in the music designated by the sign  and continue to the end of the piece)
 dal segno segno alla coda (D.S.S. alla coda)  Same as D.S. alla coda, but with a double segno
 dal segno segno al fine (D.S.S. al fine)  From the double sign to the end (i.e. return to place in the music designated by the double sign (see D.S. alla coda) and continue to the end of the piece)
 decelerando  Slowing down; decelerating; opposite of accelerando (same as ritardando or rallentando)
 deciso  Firm
 declamando  Solemn, expressive, impassioned
  (decresc.)  Gradually decreasing volume (same as diminuendo)
   From the Latin deesse meaning to be missing; placed after a catalogue abbreviation to indicate that this particular work does not appear in it; the plural, desunt, is used when referring to several works
 delicatamente  Delicately
 delicato  Delicate
 détaché (Fr.)  Act of playing notes separately
 devoto  Pious, religious
 diminuendo, dim.  Dwindling (i.e. with gradually decreasing volume) (same as decrescendo)
 disjunct  An adjective applied to a melodic line which moves by leap (intervals of more than a 2nd) as opposed to conjunct motion (by step)
 di  Of
 dissonante  Dissonant
 divisi (div.)  Divided (i.e. in a part in which several musicians normally play exactly the same notes they are instead to split the playing of the written simultaneous notes among themselves); it is most often used for string instruments, since with them another means of execution is often possible (the return from divisi is marked unisono)
 doit  Jazz term referring to a note that slides to an indefinite pitch chromatically upwards
   Sweet; con dolcezza: with sweetness
 dolcemente Sweetly
 dolcissimo  Very sweet
 dolente  Sorrowful, plaintive
 dolore  Pain, distress, sorrow, grief; con dolore: with sadness
 doloroso  Sorrowful, plaintive
 doppio movimento  lit. Double movement, i.e. twice as fast
 double dot  Two dots placed side by side after a note to indicate that it is to be lengthened by three quarters of its value
 double stop  The technique of playing two notes simultaneously on a bowed string instrument
 downtempo  A slow, moody, or decreased tempo or played or done in such a tempo. It also refers to a genre of electronic music based on this (downtempo)
 drammatico  Dramatic
 drone  Bass note or chord performed continuously throughout a composition
 drop  Jazz term referring to a note that slides to an indefinite pitch chromatically downwards
 duolo  (Ital.) grief
 dumpf (Ger.)  Dull
 Dur (Ger.) major; used in key signatures as, for example, A-Dur (A major), B-Dur (B major), or H-Dur (B major) (see also Moll (minor))
 dynamics  The relative volume in the execution of a piece of music

E 
 e (Ital.) or ed (Ital., used before vowels)  And
 eco  The Italian word for "echo"; an effect in which a group of notes is repeated, usually more softly, and perhaps at a different octave, to create an echo effect
 égal (Fr.)  Equal
 eilend (Ger.)  Hurrying
 ein wenig (Ger.)  A little
 einfach (Ger.)  Simple
 emporté (Fr.)  Fiery, impetuous
 en animant (Fr.)  Becoming very lively
 en cédant (Fr.)  Yielding
 en dehors (Fr.)  Prominently, a directive to make the melody stand out
 en mesure (Fr.) In time
 en pressant (Fr.)  Hurrying forward
 en retenant (Fr.)  Slowing, holding back
 en serrant (Fr.)  Becoming quicker
 encore (Fr.)  Again (i.e. a request to perform once more a passage or a piece); a performer returning to the stage to perform an unlisted piece
 energico  Energetic, strong
 enfatico  Emphatic
 eroico  Heroic
 espansivo  Effusive; excessive in emotional expression; gushy
 espirando  Expiring (i.e. dying away)
 espressione  Expression; e.g. con (gran, molta) espressione: with (great, much) expression
 espressivo, espress. or espr.  (Italian) Expressive
 estinto  Extinct, extinguished (i.e. as soft as possible, lifeless, barely audible)
 esultazione  Exultation
 et (Fr.)  And
 Étude (Fr.)  A composition intended for practice
 etwas (Ger.)  As an adverb, little, somewhat, slightly
 etwas bewegter (Ger.)  Moving forward a little

F 
 facile  Easy
 fall  Jazz term describing a note of definite pitch sliding downwards to another note of definite pitch
 falsetto  vocal register above the normal voice
 fantasia  A piece not adhering to any strict musical form; can also be used in con fantasia: with imagination
 feierlich (Ger.)  Solemn, solemnly
 fermata  Stop (i.e. a rest or note to be held for a duration that is at the discretion of the performer or conductor) (sometimes called bird's eye); a fermata at the end of a first or intermediate movement or section is usually moderately prolonged, but the final fermata of a symphony may be prolonged for longer than the note's value, typically twice its printed length or more for dramatic effect
 feroce  Ferocious
 festivamente  Cheerfully, in a celebratory mode
 feurig (Ger.)  Fiery
 fieramente  Proudly
 fil di voce  "thread of voice", very quiet, pianissimo
 fill (Eng.)  A jazz or rock term which instructs performers to improvise a scalar passage or riff to "fill in" the brief time between lyrical phrases, the lines of melody, or between two sections
 fine  The end, often in phrases like al fine (to the end)
 fioritura  the florid embellishment of melodic lines, either notated by a composer or improvised during a performance.
 flat  A symbol that lowers the pitch of a note by a semitone. The term may also be used as an adjective to describe a situation where a singer or musician is performing a note in which the intonation is an eighth or a quarter of a semitone too low.
 flautando  Flutelike mode; used especially for string instruments to indicate a light, rapid bowing over the fingerboard
 flebile  Feeble, low volume
 flessibile  flexible
 focoso or fuocoso  Fiery (i.e. passionate)
 forte  Strong (i.e. to be played or sung loudly)
 forte-piano  Strong-gentle (i.e. loud, then immediately soft; see dynamics)
 fortepiano An early pianoforte
   Very loud (see note at pianissimo)
 fortississimo  As loud as possible
 forza  Musical force; con forza: with force
 forzando  See sforzando
 freddo  Cold; hence depressive, unemotional
 fresco  Fresh
 fröhlich (Ger.) Lively, joyfully
 fugue (Fr.), fuga (Latin and Italian)  Literally "flight"; hence a complex and highly regimented contrapuntal form in music; a short theme (the subject) is introduced in one voice (or part) alone, then in others, with imitation and characteristic development as the piece progresses
 funebre  Funeral; often seen as marcia funebre (funeral march), indicating a stately and plodding tempo
 fuoco  Fire; con fuoco: with fire, in a fiery manner
 furia  Fury
 furioso  Furious

G 
 G.P.  Grand Pause, General Pause; indicates to the performers that the entire ensemble has a rest of indeterminate length, often as a dramatic effect during a loud section
 gaudioso  With joy
 gemächlich (Ger.)  Unhurried, at a leisurely pace
 gemendo  Groaningly
 gentile  Gentle
 geschwind (Ger.)  Quickly
 geteilt (Ger.)  See divisi
 getragen (Ger.)  Solemnly, in a stately tempo
 giocoso  Playful
 gioioso  With joy
 giusto  Strict, exact, right (e.g. tempo giusto in strict time)
 glissando  A continuous sliding from one pitch to another (a true glissando), or an incidental scale executed while moving from one melodic note to another (an effective glissando). See glissando for further information; and compare portamento.
 grace note  An extra note added as an embellishment and not essential to the harmony or melody.
 grandioso  Grand, solemn
 grave  Slow and serious
 grazioso (Fr. gratieusement or gracieusement) Graceful
 guerriero  Warlike, martial
 gustoso  (It. tasteful, agreeable) With happy emphasis and forcefulness; in an agreeable manner

H 
 H  German for B natural; B in German means B flat
 Hauptstimme (Ger.)  Main voice, chief part (i.e. the contrapuntal line of primary importance, in opposition to Nebenstimme)
 hemiola (English, from Greek)  The imposition of a pattern of rhythm or articulation other than that implied by the time signature; specifically, in triple time (for example in ) the imposition of a duple pattern (as if the time signature were, for example). See Syncopation.
 hervortretend (Ger.)  Prominent, pronounced
 hold, see fermata
 homophony  A musical texture with one voice (or melody line) accompanied by subordinate chords; also used as an adjective (homophonic). Compare with polyphony, in which several independent voices or melody lines are performed at the same time.
 hook  A musical idea, often a short riff, passage or phrase, that is used in popular music to make a song appealing and to "catch the ear of the listener".

I 
 immer (Ger.)  Always
 imperioso  Imperious, overbearing
 impetuoso  Impetuous
 improvvisando  With improvisation
 improvvisato  Improvised, or as if improvised
 improvise  To create music at the spur of the moment, spontaneously, and without preparation (often over a given harmonic framework or chord progression)
   octave above the treble staff, G5 to G6
   Octave above the in alt octave, G6 to G7
 in modo di  In the art of, in the style of
 in stand  A term for brass players that requires them to direct the bell of their instrument into the music stand, instead of up and toward the audience, thus muting the sound but without changing the timbre as a mute would
 incalzando  Getting faster and louder
 innig (Ger.)  Intimate, heartfelt
 insistendo  Insistently, deliberately
 intimo  Intimate
 intro  Opening section of a piece
 irato  Angry
 -issimamente  A suffix meaning as ... as can be (e.g. leggerissimamente, meaning as light as can be)
 -issimo  A suffix meaning extremely (e.g. fortissimo or prestissimo)
 izq. or iz. (Spa.)  Left (hand); abbreviation of izquierda

J 
 Jazz standard (or simply "standard")  A well-known composition from the jazz repertoire which is widely played and recorded.
 jete (Fr. )  Jump; a bowing technique in which the player is instructed to let the bow bounce or jump off the strings.

K 
 keyboardist (Eng.)  A musician who plays any instrument with a keyboard. In Classical music, this may refer to instruments such as the piano, pipe organ, harpsichord, and so on. In a jazz or popular music context, this may refer to instruments such as the piano, electric piano, synthesizer, Hammond organ, and so on.
 Klangfarbenmelodie (Ger.)  "Tone-color melody", distribution of pitch or melody among instruments, varying timbre
 kräftig (Ger.)  Strong

L 
 lacrimoso or lagrimoso  Tearful (i.e. sad)
 laissez vibrer, l.v. (Fr.)  French for lasciare vibrare ("let vibrate").
 lamentando  Lamenting, mournfully
 lamentoso  Lamenting, mournfully
 langsam (Ger.)  Slowly
 largamente  Broadly (i.e. slowly) (same as largo)
 larghetto  Somewhat slow; not as slow as largo
 larghezza  Broadness; con larghezza: with broadness; broadly
 larghissimo  Very slow; slower than largo
 largo  Broad (i.e. slow)
 lasciare suonare  "Let ring", meaning allow the sound to continue, do not damp; used frequently in harp or guitar music, occasionally in piano or percussion. Abbreviated "lasc. suon."
 leap or skip  A melodic interval greater than a major 2nd, as opposed to a step. Melodies which move by a leap are called "disjunct". Octave leaps are not uncommon in florid vocal music.
 lebhaft (Ger.)  Briskly, lively
 legato  Joined (i.e. smoothly, in a connected manner) (see also articulation)
 leggiadro  Pretty, graceful
 leggierissimo  Very light and delicate
 leggiero or leggiermente  Light or lightly (the different forms of this word, including leggierezza, "lightness", are spelled without the i in modern Italian, i.e. leggero, leggerissimo, leggermente, leggerezza.)
 leidenschaftlich(er) (Ger.)  (More) passionately
 lent (Fr.)  Slow
 lentando  Gradual slowing and softer
 lentissimo  Very slow
 lento  Slow
 liberamente  Freely
 libero  Free
 lilt  A jaunty rhythm
 l'istesso, l'istesso tempo, or lo stesso tempo  The same tempo, despite changes of time signature, see metric modulation
 lo stesso  The same; applied to the manner of articulation, tempo, etc.
 loco  [in] place, i.e. perform the notes at the pitch written, generally used to cancel an 8va or 8vb direction; in string music, also used to indicate return to normal playing position (see Playing the violin)
 long accent  Hit hard and keep full value of note (>)
 lontano  Distant, far away
 lugubre  Lugubrious, mournful
 luminoso  Luminous
 lunga  Long (often applied to a fermata)
 lusingando, lusinghiero  Coaxingly, flatteringly, caressingly

M 
 ma  But
 ma non tanto  But not much
 ma non troppo  But not too much
 maestoso  Majestic, stately
 maggiore  The major key
 magico  Magical
 magnifico  Magnificent
 main droite (Fr.)  [played with the] right hand (abbreviation: MD or m.d.)
 main gauche (Fr.)  [played with the] left hand (abbreviation: MG or m.g.)
 malinconico  Melancholic
 mancando  Dying away
 mano destra  [played with the] right hand (abbreviation: MD or m.d.)
 mano izquierda (Spa.)  [played with the] left hand (abbreviation: m.iz.)
 mano sinistra  [played with the] left hand (abbreviation: MS or m.s.)
 marcatissimo  With much accentuation
 marcato, marc.  Marked (i.e. with accentuation, execute every note as if it were to be accented)
 marcia  A march; alla marcia means in the manner of a march
 martellato  Hammered out
 marziale  Martial, solemn and fierce
 mäßig (Ger.)  (sometimes given as "mässig", "maessig") Moderately
 MD  See mano destra or main droite
 measure  Also "bar": the period of a musical piece that encompasses a complete cycle of the time signature (e.g. in  time, a measure has four quarter note beats)
 medesimo tempo  Same tempo, despite changes of time signature
 medley  Piece composed from parts of existing pieces, usually three, played one after another, sometimes overlapping.
 melancolico  Melancholic
 melisma  The technique of changing the note (pitch) of a syllable of text while it is being sung
 meno  Less; see meno mosso, for example, less mosso
 messa di voce  In singing, a controlled swell (i.e. crescendo then diminuendo, on a long held note, especially in Baroque music and in the bel canto period)
 mesto  Mournful, sad
 meter or metre  The pattern of a music piece's rhythm of strong and weak beats
   Half voice (i.e. with subdued or moderated volume)
 mezzo  Half; used in combinations like mezzo forte, meaning moderately loud
 mezzo forte  Half loudly (i.e. moderately loudly). See dynamics.
 mezzo piano  Half softly (i.e. moderately soft). See dynamics.
 mezzo-soprano  A female singer with a range usually extending from the A below middle C to the F an eleventh above middle C. Mezzo-sopranos generally have a darker vocal tone than sopranos, and their vocal range is between that of a soprano and that of a contralto.
 MG  See main gauche
 minore  Minor key
 misterioso  Mysterious
 mit Dämpfer (Ger.)  With a mute
 M.M.  Metronome Marking. Formerly "Mälzel Metronome."
 mobile  Mobile, changeable
 moderato  Moderate; often combined with other terms, usually relating to tempo; for example, allegro moderato
 modéré (Fr.)  Moderate
 modesto  Modest
 modulation  The act or process of changing from one key (tonic, or tonal center) to another. This may or may not be accompanied by a change in key signature.
  (Ger.)  minor; used in key signatures as, for example, a-Moll (A minor), b-Moll (B minor), or h-Moll (B minor); see also Dur (major)
 molto  Very
 mordent  Rapid alternation of a note with the note immediately below or above it in the scale, sometimes further distinguished as lower mordent and upper mordent. The term "inverted mordent" usually refers to the upper mordent.
 morendo  Dying (i.e. dying away in dynamics, and perhaps also in tempo)
 mosso  Moved, moving; used with a preceding più or meno, for faster or slower respectively
 moto  Motion; usually seen as con moto, meaning with motion or quickly
 movement  A section of a musical composition (such as a sonata or concerto)
 MS  See mano sinistra
 munter (Ger.)  Lively
 Musette (Fr.)  A dance or tune of a drone-bass character, originally played by a musette
 muta [in...]  Change [to...]: an instruction either to change instrument (e.g. flute to piccolo, horn in F to horn in B) or to change tuning (e.g. guitar muta 6 in D). Note: muta comes from the Italian verb mutare (to change); therefore it does not mean "mute", for which con sordina or con sordino is used.

N 
 nach und nach (Ger.)  Literally "more and more" with an increasing feeling. Ex. "nach und nach belebter und leidenschaftlicher" (with increasing animation and passion)
 narrante  Narrating
 natural  A symbol that cancels the effect of a sharp or a flat
 naturale (nat.)  Natural (i.e. discontinue a special effect, such as col legno, sul tasto, sul ponticello, or playing in harmonics)
 N.C.  No chord, written in the chord row of music notation to show there is no chord being played, and no implied harmony
 Nebenstimme (Ger.)  Secondary part (i.e. a secondary contrapuntal part, always occurring simultaneously with, and subsidiary to, the Hauptstimme)
 nicht (Ger.)  Not
 niente  "nothing", barely audible, dying away, sometimes indicated with a dynamic 
 nobile or nobilmente (Ital.) or Noblement (Fr.)  In a noble fashion
 noblezza  Nobility
 nocturne (Fr.)  A piece written for the night
 notes inégales (Fr.)  Unequal notes; a principally Baroque performance practice of applying long-short rhythms to pairs of notes written as equal; see also swung note
 notturno  See nocturne.
 number opera  An opera consisting of "numbers" (e.g. arias, intermixed with recitative)

O 
 obbligato  Bound, constrained
 octave  Interval between one musical pitch and another with half or double its frequency. Twelve semitones equal an octave, so do the first and the eighth (hence "oct"ave) note in a major or minor scale.
 ohne Dämpfer (Ger.)  Without a mute
 omaggio  Homage, celebration
 one-voice-per-part (OVPP)  The practice of using solo voices on each musical line or part in choral music.
 ordinario (ord.) (Ital.) or position ordinaire (Fr.) In bowed string music, an indication to discontinue extended techniques such as sul ponticello, sul tasto or col legno, and return to normal playing. The same as "naturale".
 organ trio  In jazz or rock, a group of three musicians which includes a Hammond organ player and two other instruments, often an electric guitar player and a drummer.
 oppure or ossia (Ital.) Or (giving an alternative way of performing a passage, which is marked with a footnote, additional small notes, or an additional staff)
 ostinato  Obstinate, persistent (i.e. a short musical pattern that is repeated throughout an entire composition or portion of a composition)
 ottava  Octave (e.g. ottava bassa: an octave lower)
 ouverture (Fr.) see Overture
 oversinging a term used to describe vocal styles that dominate the music they are performed in
 overture  An orchestral composition forming the prelude or introduction to an opera, oratorio, etc.

P 
 parlando or parlante  Lit. speaking; like speech, enunciated
 Partitur (Ger.)  Full orchestral score
 passionato  Passionate
 pastorale  In a pastoral style, peaceful and simple
 patetico  Passionate, emotional. A related term is Pathetique: a name attributed to certain works with an emotional focus such as Tchaikovsky's 6th symphony.
 pausa  rest
 pedale or ped  In piano scores, this instructs the player to press the damper pedal to sustain the note or chord being played. The player may be instructed to release the pedal with an asterisk marking (*). In organ scores, it tells the organist that a section is to be performed on the bass pedalboard with the feet.
 pensieroso  Thoughtfully, meditatively
 perdendosi  Dying away; decrease in dynamics, perhaps also in tempo
 pesante  Heavy, ponderous
 peu à peu (Fr.)  Little by little
 pezzo  A composition
 piacevole  Pleasant, agreeable
 piangendo  Literally 'crying' (used in Liszt's La Lugubre Gondola no. 2).
 piangevole  Plaintive
  very gently (i.e. perform very softly, even softer than piano). Dynamics in a piece should be interpreted relative to the other dynamics in the same piece. More than three s or three s are uncommon.
 piano  Gently (i.e. played or sung softly) (see dynamics)
 piano-vocal score  The same as a vocal score, a piano arrangement along with the vocal parts of an opera, cantata, or similar
 Picardy third  A Picardy third, Picardy cadence (ˈpɪkərdi ) or, in French, tierce picarde is a harmonic device used in Western classical music. It refers to the use of a major chord of the tonic at the end of a musical section that is either modal or in a minor key.
 piatti  Cymbals, generally meaning a pair of orchestral clashed cymbals
 piena  Full, as, for example, a voce piena = "in full voice"
 pietoso  Pitiful, piteous
 più  More; see mosso
 piuttosto  Rather, somewhat (e.g. allegro piuttosto presto)
 pizzicato  Pinched, plucked (i.e. in music for bowed strings, plucked with the fingers as opposed to played with the bow; compare arco, which is inserted to cancel a pizzicato instruction; in music for guitar, to mute the strings by resting the palm on the bridge, simulating the sound of pizz. of the bowed string instruments)
 plop  Jazz term referring to a note that slides to an indefinite pitch chromatically downwards.
 pochettino or poch.  Very little; diminutive of poco
 pochissimo or pochiss. Very little; superlative of poco
 poco  A little, as in poco più allegro (a little faster)
 poco rall a gradual decrease in speed
 poco a poco  Little by little
 poetico  Poetic discourse
 poi  Then, indicating a subsequent instruction in a sequence; diminuendo poi subito fortissimo, for example: getting softer then suddenly very loud
 pomposo  Pompous, ceremonious
On the bridge (i.e. in string playing, an indication to bow or to pluck very near to the bridge, producing a characteristic glassy sound, which emphasizes the higher harmonics at the expense of the fundamental); the opposite of sul tasto
 portamento  Carrying (i.e. 1. generally, sliding in pitch from one note to another, usually pausing just above or below the final pitch, then sliding quickly to that pitch. If no pause is executed, then it is a basic glissando; or 2. in piano music, an articulation between legato and staccato, like portato)
 portato or louré  Carried (i.e. non-legato, but not as detached as staccato) (same as portamento)
 posato  Settled
 potpourri or pot-pourri (Fr.)  Potpourri (as used in other senses in English) (i.e. a kind of musical form structured as ABCDEF... etc.; the same as medley or, sometimes, fantasia)
 precipitato  Precipitately
 prelude, prélude (Fr.), preludio (It), praeludium (Lat.), präludium (Ger.)  A musical introduction to subsequent movements during the Baroque era (1600s/17th century). It can also be a movement in its own right, which was more common in the Romantic era (mid-1700s/18th century)
 prestissimo  Extremely quickly, as fast as possible
 presto  Very quickly
 prima or primo (the masculine form)  First
 prima donna  Leading female singer in an opera company
 prima volta  The first time; for example prima volta senza accompagnamento (the first time without accompaniment)

Q 
 quartal  Composed of the musical interval of the fourth; as in quartal harmony
 quarter tone  Half of a semitone; a pitch division not used in most Western music notation, except in some contemporary art music or experimental music. Quarter tones are used in Western popular music forms such as jazz and blues and in a variety of non-Western musical cultures.
 quasi (Latin and Italian)  Almost (e.g. quasi recitativo almost a recitative in an opera, or quasi una fantasia almost a fantasia)
 quintal  Composed of the musical interval of the fifth; as in quintal harmony

R 
 rallentando or rall.  Broadening of the tempo (often not discernible from ritardando); progressively slower
 rapide (Fr.)  Fast
 rapido  Fast
 rasch (Ger.)  Fast
 rasguedo (Spa.)  (on the guitar) to play strings with the back of the fingernail; esp. to fan the strings rapidly with the nails of multiple fingers
 ravvivando  Quickening (lit. "reviving"), as in "ravvivando il tempo", returning to a faster tempo that occurred earlier in the piece
 recitativo  Recitative (lyrics not to be sung but to be recited, imitating the natural inflections of speech)
 religioso  Religious
 repente  Suddenly
 reprise  Repetition of a phrase or verse; return to the original theme
 restez (Fr.)  Stay in position, i.e., do not shift (string instruments)
 retenu (Fr.)  Hold back; same as the Italian ritenuto (see below)
   Ridiculous, comical
 riff a repeated chord progression or refrain
 rilassato  Relaxed
 rinforzando (or rinf.)  Reinforcing (i.e. emphasizing); sometimes like a sudden crescendo, but often applied to a single note
 risoluto  Resolute
 rit.  An abbreviation for ritardando; also an abbreviation for ritenuto
 ritardando, ritard., rit.  Slowing down; decelerating; opposite of accelerando
 ritenuto, riten., rit.  Suddenly slower, held back (usually more so but more temporarily than a ritardando, and it may, unlike ritardando, apply to a single note); opposite of accelerato
 ritmico  Rhythmical
 ritmo  Rhythm (e.g. ritmo di # battute meaning a rhythm of # measures)
 ritornello  A recurring passage
 rolled chord  See Arpeggio
 rondo  A musical form in which a certain section returns repeatedly, interspersed with other sections: ABACA is a typical structure or ABACABA
 roulade (Fr.)  A rolling (i.e. a florid vocal phrase)
 rubato  Stolen, robbed (i.e. flexible in tempo), applied to notes within a musical phrase for expressive effect
 ruhig (Ger.)  Calm, peaceful
   A rapid series of ascending or descending musical notes which are closely spaced in pitch forming a scale, arpeggio, or other such pattern. See: Fill (music) and Melisma.
 ruvido  Rough

S 
 saltando  Lit. "jumping": bouncing the bow as in a staccato arpeggio
 sanft (Ger.)  Gently
 sans nuances (Fr.)  Without shades, with no subtle variations
 sans presser (Fr.)  Without rushing
 sans rigueur (Fr.)  Without strictness, freely
 scatenato  Unchained, wild
 scherzando, scherzoso  Playfully
 scherzo  A light, "joking" or playful musical form, originally and usually in fast triple metre, often replacing the minuet in the later Classical period and the Romantic period, in symphonies, sonatas, string quartets and the like; in the 19th century some scherzi were independent movements for piano, etc.
 schleppend, schleppen (Ger.)  In a dragging manner, to drag; usually nicht schleppen ("don't drag"), paired with nicht eilen ("don't hurry") in Gustav Mahler's scores
 schlicht (Ger.)  Plain, simple
 schnell (Ger.)  Fast
 schneller (Ger.)  Faster
 schmerzlich (Ger.)  Sorrowful
 schwer (Ger.)  Heavy
 schwungvoll (Ger.)  Lively, swinging, bold, spirited
 scioltezza  Fluency, agility (used in con scioltezza)
 sciolto Fluent, agile
 scordatura  Altered or alternative tuning used for the strings of a string instrument
 scorrendo, scorrevole  Gliding from note to note
  (sec) (Fr.) Dry (sparse accompaniment, staccato, without resonance); with basso continuo accompaniment, this often means that only the chordal instrument will play, with the sustained bass instrument not playing
  sign, usually Dal segno (see above) "from the sign", indicating a return to the point marked by 
 segue  Lit. "it follows"; to be carried on to the next section without a pause
 sehr (Ger.)  Very
 sehr ausdrucksvoll (Ger.)  Very expressive
 sehr getragen (Ger.)  Very sustained
semitone  The smallest pitch difference between notes (in most Western music) (e.g. F–F) (Note: some contemporary music, non-Western music, and blues and jazz uses microtonal divisions smaller than a semitone)
 semplice  Simple
 sempre  Always
 sentimento  Feeling, emotion
 sentito  lit. "felt", with expression
 senza  Without
 senza misura  Without measure
 senza replica Without repetition: "when a movement, repeated in the first instance, must, on the Da Capo, be played throughout without repetition."
  or senza sordine (plural)  Without the mute. See sordina.
 serioso  Seriously
 serrez (Fr.)  Getting faster
 sforzando ( or )  Getting louder with a sudden strong accent
 shake  A jazz term describing a trill between one note and its minor third; or, with brass instruments, between a note and its next overblown harmonic
 sharp  A symbol that raises the pitch of the note by a semitone;the term may also be used as an adjective to describe a situation where a singer or musician is performing a note in which the intonation is somewhat too high in pitch
 short accent  Hit the note hard and short (^)
 si (Fr.)  Seventh note of the series ut, re, mi, fa, sol, la, si, in fixed-doh solmization; also used for the 5th note, sol, when sharpened, in solmization.
 sign  See segno
 silenzio  Silence (i.e. without reverberations)
 simile  Similar (i.e. continue applying the preceding directive, whatever it was, to the following passage)
 sipario  Curtain (stage)
 slancio  Momentum, con slancio: with momentum; with enthusiasm
 slargando or slentando  Becoming broader or slower (that is, becoming more largo or more lento)
 slur  A symbol in Western musical notation (generally a curved line placed over the notes) indicating that the notes it embraces are to be played without separation (that is, with legato articulation)
 smorzando (smorz.)  Extinguishing or dampening; usually interpreted as a drop in dynamics, and very often in tempo as well
 soave  Smooth, gentle
 sognando  Dreaming
 solenne  Solemn
 solo or soli (plural)  Alone (i.e. executed by a single instrument or voice). The instruction soli requires more than one player or singer; in a jazz big band this refers to an entire section playing in harmony. In orchestral works, soli refers to a divided string section with only one player to a line.
 solo break  A jazz term that instructs a lead player or rhythm section member to play an improvised solo cadenza for one or two measures (sometimes abbreviated as "break"), without any accompaniment. The solo part is often played in a rhythmically free manner, until the player performs a pickup or lead-in line, at which time the band recommences playing in the original tempo.
 sommo (masc.), somma (fem.) Highest, maximum; con somma passione: with the greatest passion
 sonata  A piece played as opposed to sung
 sonatina  A little sonata
 sonatine  A little sonata, used in some countries instead of sonatina
 sonore  Sonorous (Deep or ringing sound)
 sonoro  With full sound
 sopra  Above; directive to cross hands in a composition for piano, e.g. m.s. sopra: left hand over; opposite: sotto (below)
 sopra una corda or sull'istessa corda  To be played on one string
 soprano  The highest of the standard four voice ranges (bass, tenor, alto, soprano)
 sordina, sordine (plural)  A mute, Note: sordina, with plural sordine, is strictly correct Italian, but the forms sordino and sordini are much more commonly used as terms in music. Instruments can have their tone muted with wood, rubber, metal, or plastic devices, (for string instruments, mutes are clipped to the bridge; for brass instruments, mutes are inserted in the bell), or parts of the body (guitar; French Horn), or fabric (clarinet; timpani), among other means. In piano music (notably in Beethoven's Moonlight Sonata), senza sordini or senza sordina (or some variant) is sometimes used to mean keep the sustain pedal depressed, since the sustain pedal lifts the dampers off the strings, with the effect that all notes are sustained indefinitely.
 sordino  See sordina.
 sortita  A principal singer's first entrance in an opera
 sospirando  Sighing
 sostendo (Galician) holding back, (notably used in El Camino Real by Alfred Reed)
 sostenuto  Sustained, lengthened
 sotto voce  In an undertone (i.e. quietly)
 soutenu (Fr.)  sustained
 Sprechgesang  "spoken singing", expressionist vocal technique denoting pitched speaking. Used most notably in the compositions of Arnold Schoenberg such as Pierrot lunaire.
 spianato  Smooth, even
 spiccato  Distinct, separated (i.e. a way of playing the violin and other bowed instruments by bouncing the bow on the string, giving a characteristic staccato effect)
 spinto  Lit. "pushed"
 spirito  Spirit, con spirito: with spirit, with feeling
 spiritoso  Spirited
 staccato  Making each note brief and detached; the opposite of legato. In musical notation, a small dot under or over the head of the note indicates that it is to be articulated as staccato.
 stanza  A verse of a song
 stem  Vertical line that is directly connected to the [note] head.
 stentando or stentato (sten. or stent.)  Labored, heavy, in a dragging manner, holding back each note
 stornello  Originally truly 'improvised' now taken as 'appearing to be improvised,' an Italian 'folk' song, the style of which used for example by Puccini in certain of his operas
 strascinando or strascicante  Indicating a passage should be played in a heavily slurred manner; in some contexts it indicates a rhythmic motion resembling shuffling
 strepitoso  Noisy, forceful
 stretto  Tight, narrow (i.e. faster or hastening ahead); also, a passage in a fugue in which the contrapuntal texture is denser, with close overlapping entries of the subject in different voices; by extension, similar closely imitative passages in other compositions
 stringendo  Gradually getting faster (literally, tightening, narrowing) (i.e. with a pressing forward or acceleration of the tempo, that is, becoming stretto)
 strisciando  To be played with a smooth slur, a glissando
 suave (Sp.)  Soft
 subito  Immediately (e.g. subito , which instructs the player to suddenly drop to pianissimo as an effect); often abbreviated as sub.
 sul  Lit. "on the", as in sul ponticello (on the bridge); sul tasto (on the fingerboard); sul E (on the E string), etc.
 sul E  "on the E", indicating a passage is to be played on the E string of a violin. Also seen: sul A, sul D, sul G, sul C, indicating a passage to be played on one of the other strings of a string instrument.
 suono reale  Actual sound; primarily used with notated harmonics where the written pitch is also the sounding pitch
 sur la touche (Fr.)  Sul tasto
 syncopation  A disturbance or interruption of the regular flow of downbeat rhythm with emphasis on the sub-division or up-beat (e.g. in Ragtime music).

T 
 tacet (Lat.)  Lit. "he/she keeps silent": do not play
 ,  or tastiera (tast.)  On the fingerboard (i.e. in string playing, an indication to bow or to pluck over the fingerboard); playing over the fingerboard produces a duller, less harmonically rich, gentler tone. The opposite of sul ponticello.
 tasto solo  'single key'; used on a basso continuo part to indicate that only the written notes should be played, without RH chords as normally played by the harpsichordist/organist
 tempo  Time (i.e. the overall speed of a piece of music)
 tempo di marcia  March tempo
 tempo di mezzo  The middle section of a double aria, commonly found in bel canto era Italian operas, especially those of Rossini, Bellini, Donizetti, and their contemporaries as well in many early operas by Verdi. When present, the tempo di mezzo generally signals a shift in the drama from the slow cantabile of the first part to the cabaletta of the second, and this can take the form of some dramatic announcement or action to which the character(s) react in the cabaletta finale.
 tempo di valzer  Waltz tempo
 tempo giusto  In strict time
 tempo primo, tempo uno, or tempo I (sometimes tempo I° or tempo 1ero)  Resume the original speed
 tempo rubato  "Stolen time"; an expressive way of performing a rhythm; see rubato
 ten.  See tenuto
 teneramente; tendre or tendrement (Fr.) Tenderly
 tenerezza  Tenderness
 tenor  The second lowest of the standard four voice ranges (bass, tenor, alto, soprano)
 tenuto  Held (i.e. touch on a note slightly longer than usual, but without generally altering the note's value)
 ternary  Having three parts. In particular, referring to a three-part musical form with the parts represented by letters: ABA
 tessitura  The 'best' or most comfortable pitch range, generally used to identify the most prominent / common vocal range within a piece of music
 tierce de Picardie (Fr.) See Picardy third
 timbre  The quality of a musical tone that distinguishes voices and instruments
 time  In a jazz or rock score, after a rubato or rallentendo section, the term "time" indicates that performers should return to tempo (this is equivalent to the term "a tempo")
 tosto  Immediately
 tranquillo  Calm, peaceful
 trattenuto (tratt.) Held back with a sustained tone, similar to ritardando
  (tc)  Three strings (i.e. release the soft pedal of the piano) (see una corda)
 tremolo  Shaking. As used in 1) and 2) below, it is notated by a strong diagonal bar (or bars) across the note stem, or a detached bar (or bars) for a set of notes.
 A rapid, measured or unmeasured repetition of the same note. String players perform this tremolo with the bow by rapidly moving the bow while the arm is tense;
 A rapid, measured or unmeasured alternation between two or more notes, usually more than a whole step apart. In older theory texts this form is sometimes referred to as a "trill-tremolo" (see trill).
 A rapid, repeated alteration of volume (as on an electronic instrument);
 vibrato: an inaccurate usage, since vibrato is actually a slight undulation in a sustained pitch, rather than a repetition of the pitch, or variation in volume (see vibrato).
 tresillo (Sp.) A duple-pulse rhythmic cell in Cuban and other Latin American music
 trill  A rapid, usually unmeasured alternation between two harmonically adjacent notes (e.g. an interval of a semitone or a whole tone). A similar alternation using a wider interval is called a tremolo.
 triplet (shown with a horizontal bracket and a '3')  Three notes in the place of two, used to subdivide a beat.
 triste  Sad, wistful
 tronco, tronca  Broken off, truncated
 troppo  Too much; usually seen as non troppo, meaning moderately or, when combined with other terms, not too much, such as allegro [ma] non troppo (fast but not too fast)
 turn  Multi-note ornament above and below the main note; it may also be inverted. Also called gruppetto.
 tutti  All; all together, usually used in an orchestral or choral score when the orchestra or all of the voices come in at the same time, also seen in Baroque-era music where two instruments share the same copy of music, after one instrument has broken off to play a more advanced form: they both play together again at the point marked tutti. See also ripieno.

U 
 un, una, or uno  One or "a" (indefinite article), as exemplified in the following entries
 un poco or un peu (Fr.)  A little
   One string (i.e., in piano music, depressing the soft pedal, which alters and reduces the volume of the sound). For most notes in modern pianos, this results in the hammer striking two strings rather than three. Its counterpart, tre corde (three strings), is the opposite: the soft pedal is to be released.
 unisono (unis)  In unison (i.e., several players in a group are to play exactly the same notes within their written part, as opposed to splitting simultaneous notes among themselves); often used to mark the return from divisi
 uptempo  A fast, lively, or increased tempo, or played or done in such a tempo; it is also used as an umbrella term for a quick-paced electronic music style
 ut (Fr.)  First note of the series ut, re, mi, fa, sol, la, si, in fixed-do solmization

V 
 vagans (Lat.)  Lit. "wandering": the fifth part in a motet, named so most probably because it had no specific range
 vamp  Improvised accompaniment, usually a repeating pattern played before next musical passage. See vamp till cue. See comp and comping (jazz).
 vamp till cue  A jazz, fusion, and musical theatre term which instructs rhythm section members to repeat and vary a short ostinato passage, riff, or "groove" until the band leader or conductor instructs them to move onto the next section
 variazioni  Variations, con variazioni: with variations/changes
 veloce  Fast
 velocità Speed; con velocità: with speed
 velocissimo  As fast as possible; usually applied to a cadenza-like passage or run
 via  Away, out, off; as in via sordina or sordina via: 'mute off'
 vibrato  Vibrating (i.e. a more or less rapidly repeated slight variation in the pitch of a note, used as a means of expression). Often confused with tremolo, which refers either to a similar variation in the volume of a note, or to rapid repetition of a single note.
 vif (Fr.)  Lively
 violoncello  cello
 virtuoso  (noun or adjective) performing with exceptional ability, technique, or artistry
 vite (Fr.)  Fast
 vittorioso  Victorious
 vivace  Lively, up-tempo
 vivacissimo  Very lively
 vivamente  With liveliness
 vivezza  Liveliness, vivacity
 vivo  Lively, intense
 vocal score or piano-vocal score  A music score of an opera, musical, or a vocal or choral composition with orchestra (like oratorio or cantata) where the vocal parts are written out in full but the accompaniment is reduced to two staves and adapted for playing on piano
 voce  Voice
 volante  Flying
 volti subito (V.S.)  Turn immediately (i.e. turn the page quickly). While this indication is sometimes added by printers, it is more commonly indicated by orchestral members in pencil as a reminder to quickly turn to the next page.

W 
 weich (Ger.)  Gentle, gently
 wenig (Ger.)  A little, not much
 weniger (Ger.)  Less
 wolno (Pol.)  Loose, slowly

Z 
 Zählzeit (Ger.)  Beat
 zart (Ger.)  Tender
 Zartheit (Ger.)  Tenderness
 zärtlich (Ger.)  Tenderly
 Zeichen (Ger.)  Sign, mark
 Zeitmaß or Zeitmass (Ger.)  Time-measure (i.e. tempo)
 zelo, zeloso, zelosamente  Zeal, zealous, zealously
 ziehen (Ger.)  To draw out
 ziemlich (Ger.)  Fairly, quite, rather
 zitternd (Ger.)  Trembling (i.e. tremolando)
 zögernd (Ger.)  Hesitantly, delaying (i.e. rallentando)
 zurückhalten (Ger.)  Hold back

See also 

 Glossary of jazz and popular music
 Glossary of Schenkerian analysis
 List of musical symbols

References

External links 
 Classical musical terms
 Musical Terms Dictionary Definitions
 Music Dictionary, Dolmetsch Online
 
 Musical Terms – Glossary of music terms from Naxos

 
Music terminology
 
Wikipedia glossaries using description lists